The Pender Island Invitational (PII) is a long-running fall disc golf competition on Pender Island, British Columbia, Canada where players compete over two to four days in the pursuit of The Bark, and $10 Ace-Pots.

The PII is typically played in October, typically between Thanksgiving (Canada) and Halloween.  Recent tournaments have been played at the end of September, which provides better weather and 1 hour of additional evening daylight.

History
Begun in 1996 with a small group of players, the PII has evolved into an anticipated annual event, where both invitations to play and a spot in a real bed are sought after by an expanding group of players from across North America. From 1996 through 2012, the tournament duration was four days.  Beginning in 2013, it was decided that the tournament duration can be reduced to a minimum of 3 days, depending on attendance.

Venue

The PII is played at the beautiful and storied Golf Island Disc Park on North Pender Island, British Columbia. The course features 27 holes, with the original nine holes (now the front nine) having tone poles, and the middle and back nines having chain baskets. The course, with its many trees and rugged landscape, winds its way over and around a rocky hill just to the north of Magic Lake. The competitors require grit, courage (and a little luck), not to mention a full arsenal of shots, to compete at a high level on this challenging course.

Ace-Pots
An ace is a hole-in-one in disc golf. The vast majority of holes at the Golf Island Disc Park are par-3s, and many of these are "aceable".

When a competitor aces a hole, all other players within the group must pay him the going rate, $5-$10 historically,  for the privilege of witnessing such a spectacular shot.

The Bark

The Bark is a trophy awarded to the PII Champion.

It is made from a piece of gnarled wood from an arbutus (or Pacific Madrone) tree and has the names of past champions (Keepers of The Bark) engraved upon it. The Bark was salvaged from the Golf Island Disc Park, where arbutus trees are abundant.

The name of the 2007 2-Day Champion is also engraved on The Bark.

In the early years of the PII, the name of the player with the most aces was also engraved on the bark. However, this practice was quickly halted, due to the somewhat random nature of aces.

The Keeper of the Bark typically displays it on their mantelpiece. However, this practice is discouraged, as The Bark may be mistaken for a piece of kindling.

Champions

The PII Champion (Keeper of The Bark) is the competitor with the lowest aggregate score.

(1) Score is in relation to par - with every hole being a par 3.

(2) 2-Day Champion.  In 2007, there was both the full 4-Day tournament and a 2-Day tournament.  The 4-Day Champion was the Keeper of the Bark, but the 2-Day Champion was also noted on The Bark.

(3) Last year of original course layout - which include all tone-poles. Beginning in 2004, the course layout was changed substantially, including the replacement of tone poles to chain baskets on the middle and back nines.

(4) In 2020, the Tournament was not international due to Covid-19.  The 14 day quarantine waiver, for international competitors, was denied by the Provincial Government.

Tournament Director

With the increased popularity of the PII, a Tournament Director was appointed in 2007 to oversee rulings, protests, and player eligibility. Jamie Britton is the PII's first and only Director. The Tournament Director will also be responsible for the distribution of invitations to future PII events.  Jamie Britton is also the first recipient of the Director's Award.

Score Keeper

Kelly Sveinson is the PII's official Score Keeper. At the end of each 9 holes, the official Score Keeper records each of the competitor's scores in the Official Notebook.  All aces are also recorded.  Scores are tallied during the weekend to determine the Champion and Keeper of the Bark.

Historian Laureate

Ron Vanderdrift is the PII's official Historian Laureate.  The Historian Laureate summarizes the events of tournament in an electrotonic diary (wrap-up email). These annals include the Champion and Keeper of the Bark, winning score, total holes played, number and location of Aces, and funny/significant events of the year’s tournament.

Effect on Tourism

The PII has grown over the years to become recognized by the community as a significant sporting event that would appeal to locals and visitors.

External links
Golf Islands Disc Park Website

References

Disc golf tournaments
Disc golf in Canada